Gilmanton Ironworks (alternately Gilmanton Iron Works) is an unincorporated community in the town of Gilmanton in Belknap County, New Hampshire. It is located near the eastern boundary of the town, along a stretch of the Suncook River south of the outlet of Crystal Lake. New Hampshire Route 140 runs through the village, leading east to Alton and west to the center of Gilmanton and then Belmont.

The Gilmanton Ironworks ZIP code (03837) serves the eastern portion of the town of Gilmanton.

Sites of interest
 Crystal Lake
 Camp Bell
 Camp Fatima

References

Unincorporated communities in New Hampshire
Unincorporated communities in Belknap County, New Hampshire
Gilmanton, New Hampshire